Kilbotn is a village in Harstad Municipality in Troms og Finnmark county, Norway. The villages of Fauskevåg and Sørvika are just a few kilometres to the south of Kilbotn. The population (2001) of the village is 332, but since 2002 it has been considered a part of the Harstad urban area.

History
During World War II, Nazi Germany used Kilbotn as a U-boat base. On 4 May 1945, the last air raid of World War II in Europe took place when the Royal Navy's Fleet Air Arm attacked the Kilbotn anchorage with 44 aircraft from three offshore aircraft carriers in Operation Judgement.  The harbour contained the submarine depot ship Black Watch with the  moored alongside.  The wreck of Black Watch lies in Kilbotn harbour close to the wreck of U-711.

References

External links
https://web.archive.org/web/20070928040727/http://www.kilbotn.com/

Villages in Troms
Populated places of Arctic Norway
Harstad